Michael P. Buckley is a former Clinical Professor and Director of the Property Repositioning Program at the University of Texas at Arlington. Before moving to Texas, Buckley directed Columbia University’s Master of Science in Real Estate Development Program.

References

External links
 Fort Worth Business Press
 Turnaround Management Association
 D Magazine

University of Texas at Arlington faculty
Living people
Columbia University faculty
Year of birth missing (living people)
Place of birth missing (living people)